Ya'akov "Yankela" Grundman (20, Polish: Jakub Grundman, alternatively Jakob Grundman or Ja’akow Grundman; July 1939, Proszowice – 24 May 2004, Tel Aviv) was a Polish-born Ashkenazi Jewish Israeli professional football player and manager.

Biography

Early life
Grundman was born in Proszowice, Poland before the outbreak of World War II. After the German invasion of Poland, Grundman’s family went into hiding with a Polish farmer near the town of Proszowice. Grundman spent three years hiding in the 
town, many times going weeks at a time before getting something to eat.

At the end of the war, Grundman's father returned to work in the flour business and owned a small bakery. The Grundman's shared profits with the Polish farmer and before making aliyah to Israel, they gave him their business and two houses. Upon arrival to Israel, the family settled in the Hatikva Quarter of Tel Aviv.

Playing career
Growing up in Hatikva Quarter, Grundman joined the local side, Bnei Yehuda. Being the only Ashkenazi Jew in the squad, Grundman was nicknamed "The Pole." Grundman was part of the squad as they achieved promotion for the first time to the Liga Leumit in 1959.

Managerial career
After retiring as a player, Grundman began a career as a manager, winning the double with Maccabi Tel Aviv in 1977, as well the Israeli league in 1980 with Maccabi Netanya and the State Cup with Bnei Yehuda Tel Aviv in 1968, and with Hapoel Haifa in 1974. The peak of his managerial career was when ha, alongside Itzhak Schneor had jointly coached Israel between 1988 and 1992, and were one goal short of qualifying for the 1990 world cup.

Later life and death
Grundman spent years in the hospital fighting cancer. In 2004, IFA chairman, Itche Menahem presented him with the FIFA Order of Merit. Grundman passed the next day. Before the funeral, his coffin was brought to Ramat Gan Stadium so that the public could pay their respects. On 27 March 2004, three days after Grundman's death, the Israeli national team held a moment of silence for Yankeleh before their friendly match against Georgia in Tbilisi.

Honours

Playing honours

Club

 Bnei Yehuda Tel Aviv
 State Cup: 1968

Managerial honours

Club

 Hapoel Haifa
 State Cup: 1973–74

 Maccabi Tel Aviv
 Liga Leumit: 1976–77
 State Cup: 1976–77

 Maccabi Netanya
 Liga Leumit: 1979–80

 Shimshon Tel Aviv
 Toto Cup (2): 1986–87, 1987–88

Individual

 FIFA Order of Merit: 2004

References

1939 births
2004 deaths
People from Proszowice
Sportspeople from Lesser Poland Voivodeship
People from Kielce Voivodeship (1919–1939)
Holocaust survivors
Polish emigrants to Israel
Israeli Ashkenazi Jews
Israeli footballers
Israeli football managers
Bnei Yehuda Tel Aviv F.C. players
Maccabi Netanya F.C. managers
Maccabi Tel Aviv F.C. managers
Hapoel Haifa F.C. managers
Bnei Yehuda Tel Aviv F.C. managers
Israel national football team managers
Deaths from cancer in Israel
Association football midfielders